Mikro Monastiri is a village and a community of the Chalkidona municipality in Thessaloniki regional unit, Greece. Before the 2011 local government reform it was part of the municipality of Chalkidona, of which it was a municipal district. The 2011 census recorded 1,306 inhabitants in the village and  2,095 in the community. The community of Mikro Monastiri covers an area of 36.45 km2.

Administrative division
The community of Mikro Monastiri consists of two communities: 
Loudias (population 789)
Mikro Monastiri (population 1,306)
The aforementioned population figures are as of 2011.

Notable natives
Traianos Dellas, international football player

See also
 List of settlements in the Thessaloniki regional unit

References

Populated places in Thessaloniki (regional unit)